The first season of the animated television series Teen Titans, based on the DC Comics series created by Bob Haney and Bruno Premiani, originally aired on Cartoon Network in the United States. Developed by Glen Murakami, Sam Register, and television writer David Slack. The series was produced by DC Entertainment and Warner Bros. Animation. It stars Scott Menville, Hynden Walch, Khary Payton, Tara Strong, and Greg Cipes as the voices of the main characters.

The series revolves around a team of crime-fighting teenaged superheroes – Robin, the team's fearless leader; Starfire, an alien princess from Tamaran; Cyborg, the team’s tech-wizard who is half human and half robot; Raven, a telepathic sorceress from Azarath; and Beast Boy, a shapeshifter who can transform into any and all types of animals. The show focuses on the Titans adventures in protecting the city. The first season also features an overarching storyline focused on the Titans' main villain Slade, a mysterious mastermind who takes an interest in Robin and also the latter's growing obsession towards stopping him at any cost.

Teen Titans debuted on Cartoon Network on July 19, 2003 and concluded its first season on November 11. The season also aired on The WB's Kids' WB programming block from November 1, 2003 to February 28, 2004. The season premiered to strong ratings for Cartoon Network while displaying a moderate showing on Kids' WB; the series became Cartoon Network's highest rated new series at the time. While initial reaction to the series was mixed to negative, the season as a whole received positive reviews with many critics highlighting the series' storytelling and dialogue.

Production
The first season of Teen Titans aired on Cartoon Network. The season aired on Kids' WB Saturday mornings at 8:30 A.M. EST, beginning on November 1, 2003. The series was first greenlit in late September 2002, with Japanese-American animator Glen Murakami signed on. The series' creation was inspired by the success of Justice League, also based on DC Comics characters. However, as opposed to Justice League and other DC animated television series, the intention behind Teen Titans was to create the series for a younger audience. Series producer and animator Glen Murakami noted that the series is "lighter and has humor" while staying true to the "intent of the characters." Murakami also noted that the process of transforming material from the comics into material suitable for the target audience was similar to what was done with both Batman: The Animated Series and Batman Beyond: "We kind of have to take into consideration that were not making this cartoon just for fans of the comic book, the ones who know all the backstory and know all the continuity. We have to tell the Starfire story in half an hour! I think we took all those things into consideration, but there's just some things you can't do for children's programming." The series' mixes American style animation with Japanese anime. According to Murakami, the incorporating of anime came naturally, noting that he and Bruce Timm were anime fans and the increased presence of anime at the time.

Cast and characters

The first season employs a cast of five main voice actors. Scott Menville provided the voice of Robin, the Titans' leader and martial arts expert. Greg Cipes voiced Beast Boy, a green-skinned shapeshifter who can change into any animal. Cyborg, the half-robot half-human technological genius of the Titans, was portrayed by Khary Payton. Tara Strong played Raven, a sorceress from Azarath whose powers are triggered and controlled by her emotions. Starfire, a Tamaranian princess who still struggles to acclimate to Earth customs, was voiced by Hynden Walch. Walch also provided the voice for Blackfire, Starfire's older sister, in the episode "Sisters" while Menville played Robin's alter-ego Red X in the episode "Masks".

In addition to the main cast, the season also employs several guest voice actors. Actor Dee Bradley Baker provided the voice effects for Cinderblock, a humanoid concrete monster, appearing in two episodes of the season. Baker also provided the voice of Plasmus in the episode "Divide and Conquer." Veteran actor Ron Perlman played Slade, the season's main villain, appearing in six episodes. The episode "Final Exam" featured the vocal talents of Lauren Tom, who voiced H.I.V.E. members Jinx and Gizmo, and Kevin Michael Richardson, who provided the voice of Mammoth. Tom also voiced Gizmo in the episode "Car Trouble." In the episode "Forces of Nature", Stuart Scott Bullock, better known as S. Scott Bullock, provided the voice of Thunder and Quinton Flynn provided the voice for Lightning. Thunder and Lightning are supernatural brothers who use their powers to cause mischief-they would later become allies of the Titans in Season 5. In the episode "The Sum of His Parts", Tom Kenny, the voice of SpongeBob SquarePants in the Nickelodeon series, provided the voices of Mumbo Jumbo and robot hermit Fixit, the episode's main villains. Recurring villain Dr. Light, voiced by character actor Roger Bumpass, debuted in the episode "Nevermore." Keith Szarabajka filled the voice of Trigon. He later returns in Season 4 as the season's main villain, important to that season's story arc. Tracey Walter lent his voice to the main villain of the episode "Switched", Puppet King. The episode "Deep Six" featured the vocal talents of Clancy Brown (who portrayed the villain Trident), veteran actor and comedian Dave Coulier (who played Tramm and Captain), and actor and writer Wil Wheaton (who voiced fellow hero Aqualad). The episode "Mad Mod" featured English actor Malcolm McDowell providing the voice of the titular character. Actor and singer James Arnold Taylor provided the voices for Cash and Sammy in the episode "Car Trouble."

Reception and release
Teen Titans debuted on Cartoon Network on July 19, 2003 with the highest ratings among boy 6–11 for the network. Ratings for the following two episodes showed growth across the target demographics, including a 78 percent rise in viewers age 6–11 and an 87% rise in boy viewers age 6–11. Season one completed its run on the network as the network's most successful new series, averaging 635,000 viewers among the kids 6–11 demographic (2.7 rating) and 1.021 million viewers in the kids 2–11 demographic (2.6 rating). The success of the series on the channel prompted Cartoon Network to order 52 more episodes of the series. The series debuted on Kids' WB with a moderate standing among kids 6–11 with a 3.5%/17 rating. The series ranked among the top ten programs in the target demographics, including kids 2–11, kids 6–11 and tweens 9–14.

Initial reviews of the series were negative. KJB of IGN gave the series a 4 out of 10 rating, writing that the series "fails to live up to the source material or its potential. The series is bogged down by an overly cartoony style that looks more like anime without most of the good points." KJB further added, "Teen Titans, from its after school special style attempts at storytelling to its painfully annoying signature tune, fails to meet even the lowest of expectations for this series." Los Angeles Daily News writer David Kronke offered a more mixed review, find the dialogue "occasionally witty", but ultimately dismissing the characters "too bratty to have any interest in saving the world or even in cleaning it up a little." Ethan Alter of Media Life Magazine also wrote a mixed review of the first two episodes. Alter praised the animation and action scenes, noting that the animation possess "a grace and fluidity" not seen on cable cartoon shows. However, his main criticism was towards the writing, noting that the stories have been "told a thousand times before in previous superhero cartoons."

Despite initial reviews, the full season reviews were more positive. Filip Vukcevic of IGN awarded the season an 8 out of 10 score, writing "It's clear that Teen Titans is primarily aimed at children, so you're obviously not going to have anything too mature here. However, what you do get is some very focused, funny, and entertaining storytelling from a group of characters that, when they're gone, you'll actually miss." Writing for DVD Verdict, Mike Jackson gave the first season a mixed review. Jackson found the violence and demonic imagery troubling, saying that he would not let his son watch the show. However, Jackson praised the voice cast, particularly Ron Perlman, who voiced Slade. David Cornelius of DVD Talk classified the first season release as "Highly Recommended", except for those with the first two volumes. Cornelius commented that ""Teen Titans" goes big and broad and bold, to heck with the subtleties, and it actually works. The writers know how to balance the swift action with the crisp dialogue (Starfire's constant comic mishandling of the language has yet to grow stale), and the stories, while zany and far-fetched, become involving enough to capture the hearts of all ages."

Episodes

Home media release
Warner Home Video first released the first season on DVD into two parts. The first volume containing the first six episodes was released in 2004 while the second volume containing the last seven episodes of the season was released in 2005. It wasn't until 2006 that the studio finally released the complete first season. A manufacture-on-demand Blu-ray was released in 2018 by the Warner Archive Collection.

References

Teen Titans (TV series) seasons
2003 American television seasons